Neil James Perry (born 27 May 1958) is a former English cricketer.  Perry was a right-handed batsman who bowled slow left-arm orthodox.  He was born at Sutton, Surrey.

Perry made his first-class debut for Glamorgan in 1979 against the touring Sri Lankans.  From 1979 to 1981, he represented the county in 13 first-class matches, with his final first-class match coming against Worcestershire.  In his first-class career, he took 21 wickets at a bowling average of 43.76, with best figures of 3/51.  In the field he took 9 catches and with the bat he ended his first-class career with an unimpressive batting average of 2.37.

References

External links
Neil Perry at Cricinfo
Neil Perry at CricketArchive

1958 births
Living people
People from Sutton, London
Sportspeople from Surrey
English cricketers
Glamorgan cricketers